Paul Stead (born 9 August 1958) is a British designer, entrepreneur and CEO of BreweryLondon, a creative business catalyst. Alongside this Paul has a number of board positions supporting a portfolio of business interests, whilst also lectures at a number of UK Universities. Prior to his current role, Paul was the co-CEO at NewEdge; a US/UK innovation strategy consultancy, known for the premise "you can kill an idea, but you can't kill an opportunity". He has also held several executive level positions with leading firms such as Fitch Worldwide and PSD Associates.

Work in industry 
Stead had two working stints at Fitch & Co., a global design firm. 
He first joined the company in 1981 after receiving a MA with distinction from High Wycombe and First Class (honors) in furniture design from Loughborough University.

In 1984 Stead made Associate Director, becoming the youngest to do so in company history. Four years later he left Fitch & Co. to form his own consultancy firm, PSD Associates.  PSD grew to 85 employees, serving such clients as Coca-Cola, Unilever, Motorola, Nokia, BT Group, and Lucent Technologies; making it a leading multidisciplinary consultancy firm.

Stead sold PSD in 2000 to Cordiant Communications Group (CCG), who in-turn bought Fitch. Stead was appointed Global CEO of Fitch Worldwide with a seat on the CCG Management Board. During this period, Fitch Worldwide was the world’s largest design consultancy firm with approximately 750 employees and 26 offices around the globe.

After CCG and Fitch Worldwide were sold to WPP Group, Stead left to form The Brewery in 2004.
In 2005, The Brewery was introduced to NewEdge, led by Dr. Pam Henderson, through a mutual client. 
The companies partnered in 2007 as NewEdge + The Brewery and in 2010 became known as NewEdge.

In 2012 Paul resigned from NewEdge to found BreweryLondon, a partner of The Brewery Group companies.

BreweryLondon consults to leading global brands on Design + Innovation services, with a strong "growth" agenda.

In 2016 Paul was awarded an honorary PhD for services to Design & Entrepreneurship from New Bucks University.

Since 2017 Paul has written a month "Design Thinking" column in The Manufacturer Magazine, has judged their UK Innovation Awards and participated at Smart Factory Expo ( The UK's Biggest Digital Manufacturing Show ) In addition, he now personally invests in start-up and scale up businesses and is an ambassador for E2Exchange.com

Contributions and activities 
• Ambassador for E2Exchange.com - event speaker
• Design Matters?  -  Features writer for The Manufacturer Magazine 
• Key note speaker at the Shirlaws Innovation conference
• Presenter at the Confederation of Danish Industry's DI Innovation Conference
• Member of TED / IOD / Marketing Society
• Advisor to the United Kingdom’s Design Council
• Member of the Chartered Society of Designers 
• Guest Lecturer at Birmingham, Central, Buckinghamshire, Universities and Parnham House 
• Has contributed to many of the leading design publications such as New Design, Design Week, FX, Marketing Week
• Participated in the BBC School’s Design program

Company Awards and Commendations 
• IDEA (Industrial Design Excellence Awards) Gold - for www.eastmaninnovationlab.com 
• RedDot Design Award / IF Product Design Award / Design Week Award (Consumer Product Design) / Idea Award Silver Winner in the Computer Equipment Category - Dell Adamo XPS 
• Peroni Blue Ribbon Design Awards with Alessi and DesignBoom - Aperitivo On-The-Go
• Shortlisted for Benchmark Awards in the Manufacturing - campaigns category for work on Yin Yang Collection for Standard Textile Corporation

Bibliography 
• SK Textile Inc.: details matter.
• Vision for Innovation

References

External links 
 new-edge.com
 brewerylondon.com

1958 births
Living people
British designers